Barium stannate is an oxide of barium and tin with the chemical formula BaSnO3. It is a wide band gap semiconductor with a perovskite crystal structure.

References

Barium compounds
Stannates
Semiconductor materials
Perovskites